, better known by his stage name , is a Japanese actor.

Personal life
Joe Odagiri was born in Tsuyama, Okayama prefecture. Though he was accepted by Kochi University, he turned it down for an opportunity to study in the United States. He had originally intended to study film directing at California State University, Fresno, but mistakes in the application process landed him in acting classes. He often says that Tokyo is his second hometown.

On December 27, 2008, at a news conference in Tokyo, Odagiri announced his new project. He would be director of a film that would take 11 years to make.

Filmography (as Actor)

Film

Television

Anime
 Zaion: I Wish You Were Here (2001), Yuji Tamiya

Filmography (as Director)

Bibliography

Books
 Joe Odagiri: Sweater Book (2000)
 Odagirism (2001)

Discography

Albums 
 Toto (2020) 
 Hardy (2018) 
 Cherry and blueberries (2016)

See also
Odagiri effect a television phenomenon named after Joe Odagiri which first occurred in Kamen Rider Kuuga.

References

External links
 Joe Odagiri at Dongyu Club
 Joe Odagiri on Instagram
 

1976 births
Living people
Actors from Okayama Prefecture
Japanese male film actors
Japanese male television actors
Musicians from Okayama Prefecture
20th-century Japanese male actors
21st-century Japanese male actors